The current Malaysian Minister of Education is Fadhlina Sidek since 3 December 2022. The minister is supported by the Deputy Ministers of Education. The minister administers the portfolio through the Ministry of Education.

Political significance 
Historically, the position of Minister of Education is considered a stepping stone for future Malaysian prime ministers. All Malaysian prime ministers to date have held this position in their career except the first and ninth prime minister, Tunku Abdul Rahman and Ismail Sabri Yaakob.

List of ministers of education
The following individuals have been appointed as Minister of Education, or any of its precedent titles:

Political Party:

References

 
Ministry of Education (Malaysia)
Lists of government ministers of Malaysia